Evening, McDonald Lake, Glacier National Park is a black and white photograph taken by Ansel Adams in 1942. It was one of the group that he took detailing several national parks of the United States in 1941 and 1942 at the series named Ansel Adams Photographs of National Parks and Monuments, 1941 - 1942.

Analysis
The picture was taken at the Glacier National Park in Montana and depicts a view of the Lake McDonald, looking across to the distant mountains and to the clouds. The photograph shows a large, still lake extending horizontally off the frame and halfway up vertically, reflecting the rest of the scene. In the distance, a mountain range can be seen, with a gap in the center and one faint smaller mountain in between. The sky is cloudy and large dark clouds rest at the very top of the frame.

A print of this picture is kept with the series Ansel Adams Photographs of National Parks and Monuments, 1941 - 1942 at the National Archives at College Park. There is also a print at the Library of Congress, in Washington, D.C..

References

Photographs by Ansel Adams
Landscape photographs
Photographs of the United States
1942 in art
1942 photographs
1940s photographs